Jack Em Popoy: The Puliscredibles is a 2018 Philippine action comedy film directed by Mike Tuviera and starring Coco Martin, Vic Sotto, and Maine Mendoza. Its plot revolves around a team of "puliscredibles"—consisting of three charismatic, adventurous police officers Jack (Martin), Popoy (Sotto), and Emily (Mendoza)—who embark on a mission to stop crimes from occurring within their vicinity. The film was released on December 25, 2018, as an official entry to the 2018 Metro Manila Film Festival.

Plot
Senior Police Officer 3 Perfecto "Popoy/Pops" Fernandez (Vic Sotto) is a veteran police officer and is a doting father to his daughter Police Officer 1 Emily "Em" Fernandez (Maine Mendoza). Pops is working at a drug-syndicate led by Don Antonio Montenegro (Ronaldo Valdez) with his children Andrew (Arjo Atayde) and Andrea (Ryza Cenon). But Valerie (Cherry Pie Picache), Antonio's second wife doesn't know about the family business and Alfredo is placing Angelo (Baste) in the future. Not until Police Senior Inspector Jacinto "Jack" Halimuyac (Coco Martin) came into the picture to investigate the Montenegros. During a police operation, Andrew was arrested but was later released by Police Senior Superintendent Arturo Punongbayan (Tirso Cruz III). The Montenegros resort to more violent measures on Pops. Jack and Pops are now planning their mission against the Montenegros.

Pops learned that Jack has a lonely past. He and his mother was abandoned by his father, while Jack learned that Emily is not Pops' biological daughter. He is the daughter of Pops' partner Domingo (Lito Lapid) who was killed in a mission. But, it found out, that Jack is Pops son whom he abandoned. But, during a mission where Pops was shot and was taken to the hospital, Jack heard from Em that Pops is his father during a conversation. Pops explained to Jack that when seeking his revenge for the death of his partner, he was setup by Antonio of accepting bribe money to protect them and accused of killing Domingo resulting to his imprisonment. But he was later acquitted. He looked for Jack and his wife Rowena (Glydel Mercado), but failed. Jack also said that he and his mother was forced to leave because Antonio's men are trying to kill them and wander around the streets. But they were later adopted by Nanding (Jose Manalo), Otep (Wally Bayola) and Binoy (Paolo Ballesteros), until his mother died. There, he blamed Pops for all the miseries they suffered. But, when Arturo learned about the operation, he suspends Jack and Pops while they are reiterating that someone from the police force are protecting the Montenegros. After being suspended, Pops went into an operation at the Port Area. He brought Jack with him and when they are at the Port Area, Pops handcuffed Jack and said that this mission will be his final encounter with the Montenegros.

But, Arturo told Pops to abort his mission because of his suspension, and that will be grounds for possible dismissal. But, Pops saw Arturo pointing a gun at him and he shot Arturo. It found out, Arturo is the one protecting the Montenegros. Jack called Em for back up, there she told Jack that what he is doing is for him to prove that Pops loves him. Jack, Pops and Em joined forces to defeat the Montenegros. Jack battle against Andrew in an abandoned ship. There, Andrew fell in an open pit killing him instantly. Em fought Andrea inside a container truck being lifted. While trying to get her gun, Andrea fell from the container van. While in the warehouse, where Domingo was murdered, Pops fought Antonio until he was shot by Jack and Em. Afterwards, Pops along with his friends celebrated Jack's birthday.

Cast

Main cast
Coco Martin as PS/Insp. Jacinto "Jack" Halimuyac
Vic Sotto as SPO3 Perfecto "Popoy/Pops" Fernandez
Maine Mendoza as PO3 Emily "Em" Fernandez

Supporting cast
Arjo Atayde as Andrew Montenegro 
Ronaldo Valdez as Antonio Montenegro
Ryza Cenon as Andrea Montenegro
Tirso Cruz III as PS/Supt. Arturo Punongbayan
Cherry Pie Picache as Valerie Montenegro
Jose Manalo as Fernando "Nanding" Halimuyac
Wally Bayola as Joseph "Otep" Halimuyac
Paolo Ballesteros as Robin "Binoy" Halimuyac
Mark Lapid as SPO2 Gregorio "Greg" Morales
Ronwaldo Martin as Rico 
Chai Fonacier as PO1 Jonalyn Fuentes
PJ Endrinal as Bebong
Ryzza Mae Dizon as Bebang
Baeby Baste as Angelo Montenegro

Guest cast
Lito Lapid as Sgt. Domingo
Whitney Tyson as Angelo's yaya
Lordivino "Bassilyo" Ignacio
Bryan "Smugglaz" Lao
Thomas "Mhot" Lynmuel
Pedro "Zaito" Canon Jr.
Roy "Shernan" Gaite
Marky "Bos×1ne" Maglasang
Sancho delas Alas as Andrew's Men
Anghel Marcial as Andrew's Men
Wilmar Peñaflorida as Andrew's Men
Benzon Dalina as Andrew's Men
Jelson Bay
Glydel Mercado as Rowena delos Reyes (Jack's Mother)
Allan Paule as Bebong and Bebang's father
Pauleen Luna as herself
Allan K. as himself
Luane Dy as herself
Jerald Napoles as P/Insp. James Reidentor Magpayo
Pekto as PO2 Piolo Pasakal

Production

Announcement
On June 13, 2018, Coco Martin confirmed that he will star in an action movie alongside Vic Sotto. Martin has stated that it was his dream to work with Vic Sotto since he is a fan of the Sotto trio, consisting of Tito, Vic & Joey. The 2018 Metro Manila Film Festival announced that Jack Em Popoy: The Puliscredibles will be one of the four accepted script entries.

On June 29, Maine Mendoza joined the cast as the daughter of Vic Sotto’s character. Ryzza Mae Dizon, Baeby Baste, Jose Manalo, Wally Bayola, Ryza Cenon, Arjo Atayde, Cherry Pie Picache, Tirso Cruz III and Ronaldo Valdez were also confirmed to be part of the movie. According to Vic Sotto, this will be Maine Mendoza’s first role in the action genre, while there are challenges she had to tackle with.

On July 16, Coco Martin was initially attached to direct the movie, but due to directorial conflicts with the acclaimed television series Ang Probinsyano, who also had Martin as one of the directors, he drops out and decides to be the producer instead, with Mike Tuviera signing on as the new director considering his successful track record. Despite this, Martin freely admitted that he will still handle the creative aspects of the movie.

Release
The movie was released on December 25, 2018, by Star Cinema internationally and by Axinite Digicinema Inc. in the Philippines, and produced by APT Entertainment, CCM Productions and M-Zet Productions - the last two of which were founded by Coco Martin and Vic Sotto respectively - with Axinite Digicinema Inc. as distributor. It is one of the eight entries selected for the 2018 Metro Manila Film Festival. Coco Martin will have a fifty percent share as a producer in terms of box office sales and revenue.

Critical reception
Francis Joseph Cruz of Rappler bemoaned the film's plot, recycled gags and lack of innovation, stating: "One of its bigger problems is that it never endeavored to expand its kind of fun. For all the film's crisscrossing between comedy and action, it never felt anything more than just a generic hodgepodge." He also expressed concern about Jack Em Popoy'''s violent content, taking umbrage at what he saw as "a bigger issue here than just the gross lack of creative ambition." especially with young children as its intended audience.

Michelle Anne P. Soliman of BusinessWorld was somewhat less critical, stating "I sat in theater dreading the probable shallowness of the storyline. But it turned out to be more bearable than I expected. Simply put, the story presented issues on loss, abandonment, and criminality starring main actors from Eat Bulaga! "Kalyeserye" (excluding Alden Richards) and the lead actor of Ang Probinsyano." She also praised Mendoza and Martin's acting and noted the stark absence of product placement which was common in Vic Sotto productions, but felt that the Eat Bulaga'' segment was unnecessary, speculating that it was merely to give Pauleen Luna a cameo appearance.

Notes
The characters of Nanding, Otep and Binoy played by Jose Manalo, Wally Bayola and Paolo Ballesteros are personifications of Fernando Poe, Jr., Joseph Estrada and Robin Padilla.
Some of the casts became part of Coco Martin's series Ang Probinsyano.

Awards and nominations

References

External links

2018 films
Philippine action comedy films
2010s police comedy films
Films about police officers
2018 action comedy films
Films directed by Mike Tuviera